Pentabrachion is a plant genus from the family Phyllanthaceae first described as a genus in 1864. It contains only one known species, Pentabrachion reticulatum, native to tropical Africa (Cameroon, Gabon, Equatorial Guinea, Republic of the Congo, Democratic Republic of the Congo).

References

Phyllanthaceae
Phyllanthaceae genera
Monotypic Malpighiales genera
Flora of West-Central Tropical Africa